Biselele Tshamala (born 26 November 1990) is a Zimbabwe rugby union player, currently playing for the  in the 2022 Currie Cup First Division. His preferred position is flanker.

Professional career
Tshamala represented Zimbabwe Academy in the 2019 Rugby Challenge. He was then named in the  squad for the 2022 Currie Cup First Division. Tshamala is a Zimbabwean international in both 15-a-side and sevens.

References

External links
itsrugby.co.uk Profile

1990 births
Living people
Rugby union flankers
Zimbabwean rugby union players
Zimbabwe international rugby union players
Zimbabwe Academy rugby union players
Zimbabwe Goshawks players